Bothrocophias tulitoi is a species of venomous pit viper found in Colombia.

References 

Reptiles described in 2022
Reptiles of Colombia
Endemic fauna of Colombia
Viperinae